GEOM is the main storage framework for the FreeBSD operating system. It is available in FreeBSD 5.0 and later releases, and provides a standardized way to access storage layers. GEOM is modular and allows for geom modules to connect to the framework. For example, the geom_mirror module provides RAID1 or mirroring functionality to the system. A number of modules are provided as part of FreeBSD and others have been developed independently and are distributed via (e.g.) GitHub.

GEOM was developed for the FreeBSD Project by Poul-Henning Kamp and NAI Labs, the Security Research Division of Network Associates, Inc. under DARPA/SPAWAR contract N66001-01-C-8035 ("CBOSS"), as part of the DARPA CHATS research program. The name symbolizes its impact on disk geometry.

Stacked design 

Because of geom's modular design, modules can be 'stacked' together to form a chain of geom layers. For example, on top of the geom_mirror module an encryption module can be added, such as geom_eli to provide a mirrored and encrypted volume. Each module has both consumers and providers. A provider is the 'source' of the geom module, often a physical hard drive but sometimes a virtualized disk such as a memory disk. The geom module in turn provides an 'output' device. Other geom modules, called consumers, can use this provider to create a chain of modules connected to each other.

Source → geom module → Output

is referred to as:

Provider → geom module → Consumer(s)

For example, the geom_mirror module may use (as a consumer) the following providers: /dev/ada0, /dev/ada1, while it creates (as a provider) a new device called /dev/mirror/gm0. At the end of the geom chain, often a filesystem is applied to actually use the geom provider for something useful. The provider created by geom modules behaves just like a physical hard drive and as such can contain filesystems such as FreeBSD's native Unix File System (UFS).

Available modules 

Storage modules 
 geom_stripe (RAID0)
 geom_mirror (RAID1)
 geom_raid (Supports RAID functionality on "software raid" controllers)
 geom_raid3 (RAID3)
 geom_raid5 (RAID5, not present in -CURRENT yet)
 geom_concat (concatenating, also called spanning or JBOD)
 geom_vinum (legacy volume manager with RAID0/1/4/5 support)
 geom_ccd (legacy volume manager with RAID0 and rudimentary RAID1 support)

Encryption and compression modules
 geom_eli (also called GELI, provides traditional encryption using AES, Blowfish, Triple DES or Camellia algorithms. It can support data authentication using MD5, SHA1, SHA256, SHA384, SHA512 or RIPEMD160)
 geom_bde (also called GBDE, leading edge encryption with four cryptographic barriers)
 geom_shsec (shared secret encryption module)
 geom_uzip (read-only ZIP compressed images)

Filesystem modules
 geom_label (allows providers to have their own name labeled for easy partitioning)
 geom_journal (adds journaling support to the Unix File System (UFS))
 geom_cache (adds caching support for increased performance using RAM as buffercache)

Disk partitioning
 geom_flashmap (partition parts of e.g. Flash memory using either offsets or context)
 geom_part (supports Disk partitioning of GEOM providers)
 geom_part_apm (support Apple Partition Map)
 geom_part_bsd (supports BSD disklabel)
 geom_part_bsd64 (supports the 64-bit variant of BSD disklabels, as used by DragonFly BSD)
 geom_part_ebr (supports Extended boot record) 
 geom_part_gpt (supports GUID Partition Table)
 geom_part_ldm (supports Logical Disk Manager)
 geom_part_mbr (supports Master boot record)
 geom_part_vtoc8 (supports Sun/Solaris VTOC8 disk labels)

Virtualization
 geom_mountver (enables mount verification)
 geom_multipath (support Multipath I/O to underlying disks)
 geom_nop (creates a transparent module used for debugging and testing)
 geom_gate (creates a virtual disk using network disk back-end)
 geom_virstor (allows overloading a geom provider by creating a provider larger than its consumer)
 geom_linux_lvm (reads Linux LVM2 volumes)
 geom_zero (creates a dummy provider that absorbs all writes and returns zeros on reads)

External links

References 

FreeBSD